Dungiven railway station served Dungiven in County Londonderry in Northern Ireland.

The Londonderry and Coleraine Railway opened the station on 4 July 1883.

It closed on 1 January 1933.

Routes

References

Disused railway stations in County Londonderry
Railway stations opened in 1883
Railway stations closed in 1933
Dungiven
Railway stations in Northern Ireland opened in the 19th century